Conan was a medieval Bishop of Cornwall.

Conan was nominated by King Æthelstan. He was consecrated between July 924 and 932. He died between 946 or 953 and November 955.

However, in the view of historian D. P. Kirby, it was almost certainly in 936 that Æthelstan "established Bishop Conan at St. Germans".

Citations

References

External links
 

Bishops of Cornwall
10th-century English bishops
10th-century deaths
Year of birth unknown